Il y a un sorcier à Champignac,  by Franquin, is the second album of the Spirou et Fantasio series, and the first to tell a long intricate story in what would become the Spirou tradition, in contrast to the previous short format stories. After serial publication in Spirou magazine, it was released as a complete hardcover album in 1951.

This work introduces several key characters in the series, and the village of Champignac-en-Cambrousse (a name derived from the French word for mushrooms, and 'cambrousse' meaning rural backwater).

Story 
In There is a Sorcerer in Champignac, Spirou and Fantasio go on a bicycle camping trip to the country and end up near the village of Champignac-en-Cambrousse. They meet its pompous mayor and rustic inhabitants, and an aloof local landowner, the Count of Champignac. Strange phenomena are affecting farm and wild animals, and the frightened villagers blame a gypsy who is passing through. Spirou and Fantasio, however, discover that the real culprit is the Count, deeply involved in creating strange concoctions from mushrooms, and they rescue the vagabond from a lynch mob. Later, the Count creates a drug that within a limited time will endow superhuman strength, which a gangster steals to create mayhem.

Background 
This album demonstrates an evolution in Franquin's style from his previous drawing work, to a new treatment of characters and movement. Franquin's new Spirou is now distinct, and no longer an effort to mimic Jijé's Spirou as precisely as possible. As it is Franquin's first long format story (created gradually in 2 page installments over 32 Spirou issues) its dramaturgic construction may be considered as one shorter story with a separate bonus story added to the end, with the initial one being the seminal work. 

Jijé is credited as co-author of the script, following a scenario by Jean Darc, alias Henri Gillain, Jijé's brother, who is attributed with the conception of the Count of Champignac and his eccentric mushroom creations.

References 

1951 graphic novels
1951 in comics
Comics by André Franquin
Literature first published in serial form
Spirou et Fantasio albums
Witch hunting in fiction
Works originally published in Spirou (magazine)